Semyonovskaya is a rural locality (a village) in Beketovskoye Rural Settlement, Vozhegodsky District, Vologda Oblast, Russia. The population was 3 as of 2002.

Geography 
The distance to Vozhega is 68 km, to Beketovskaya is 16 km. Barkanovskaya, Miguyevskaya, Vershina are the nearest rural localities.

References 

Rural localities in Vozhegodsky District